Beth Ann Gylys (born 1964 Passaic, New Jersey) is a poet and professor of English and Creative Writing at Georgia State University. She has published five poetry collections, three of which have won awards.

Early life and education
Gylys grew up in Pittsburgh, Pennsylvania, and graduated from Allegheny College with a bachelor's degree in 1986. She went on to receive a master's degree from Syracuse University and a Ph.D. in English and Creative Writing from University of Cincinnati. She has also attended the Stonecoast Writers Conference in Portland, Maine.

Career
Gylys formerly taught at Mercyhurst College in Erie, Pennsylvania. She is currently a professor of English and Creative Writing at Georgia State University. Her poems have appeared in The Paris Review, The Southern Review, The Kenyon Review, The New Republic, The Antioch Review, and The Columbia Review.

Events
Gylys' poem "Erratic Gardener" was featured on an episode of Garrison Keillor's A Prairie Home Companion in 1999. Her book of personal ads, titled Matchbook, has been set to music by composer Dan Welcher. She was a featured guest poet at the January 2013 meeting of the Georgia Poetry Society.

Personal life
She is married to Thomas Forsthoefel who is Professor of Religious Studies at Mercyhurst College and the Erie County, PA, Poet Laureate.

Awards
 Quentin R. Howard Award for Balloon Heart
 Gerald Cable Book Award for Bodies that Hum
 The Ohio State University Press/The Journal Award in Poetry for Spot in the Dark

Works

Collections of poems
 Balloon Heart, Wind Publications, 1997, 
 Bodies that Hum, Silverfish Review Press, 1999, 
 Spot in the Dark, Ohio State University Press, 2004, 
 Matchbook, La Vita Poetica Press, 2007, 
 Sky Blue Enough to Drink, Grayson Books, 2016, 
 Body Braille, Iris Press, 2020, 
 The Conversation Turns to Wide-Mouth Jars, with Cathy Carlisi and Jennifer Wheelock, Kelsay Books, 2022,

Anthology appearances
 Anthology of Best Magazine Verse (1996)
 American Poetry: the Next Generation, Gerald Costanzo, Jim Daniels Eds, Carnegie Mellon University Press, 2000, 
 "Beyond the Map Edge", Under the Rock Umbrella: Contemporary American Poets from 1951–1977, Editor William J. Walsh, Mercer University Press, 2006, 
"Preference", The best American erotic poems: from 1800 to the present, Editor David Lehman, Scribner Poetry, 2008, 
"Not an Affair, a Sestina" and "The Scene" were included in The Incredible Sestina Anthology, Editor Daniel Nester, Write Bloody Publishing, 2013,

References

External links
"Beth Gylys Interviewed by Josephine Yu", The Southeast Review, February 1, 2010
 
Beth Gylys on The Joe Milford Poetry Show, July 20, 2009
Where the poem comes from: Beth Gylys 

1964 births
Allegheny College alumni
Georgia State University faculty
Living people
Writers from Passaic, New Jersey
Writers from Pittsburgh
Syracuse University alumni
University of Cincinnati alumni
University of Southern Maine alumni
American women poets
21st-century American poets
American women academics
21st-century American women writers